Players and pairs who neither have high enough rankings nor receive wild cards may participate in a qualifying tournament held one week before the annual Wimbledon Tennis Championships.

Seeds

  Adam Peterson /  Jim Thomas (first round)
  Paul Rosner /  Jason Weir-Smith (first round)
  Lars Burgsmüller /  Michael Kohlmann (qualifying competition)
  Jocelyn Robichaud /  Michael Sell (qualified)
  Alejandro Hernández /  Cristiano Testa (first round)
  Paul Hanley /  Nathan Healey (qualifying competition)
  Grant Silcock /  Mitch Sprengelmeyer (qualifying competition)
  Jonathan Erlich /  Lior Mor (qualifying competition)

Qualifiers

  James Blake /  Kevin Kim
  Stefano Pescosolido /  Vincenzo Santopadre
  Noam Behr /  Satoshi Iwabuchi
  Jocelyn Robichaud /  Michael Sell

Qualifying draw

First qualifier

Second qualifier

Third qualifier

Fourth qualifier

External links

2000 Wimbledon Championships – Men's draws and results at the International Tennis Federation

Men's Doubles Qualifying
Wimbledon Championship by year – Men's doubles qualifying